The National APIDA Panhellenic Association (NAPA) is an umbrella council for twenty Asian, Pacific Islander, and Desi American fraternities and sororities (Greek Letter organizations) in universities in the United States.

History 
In the summer of 2004, 9 fraternal organizations which served Asian and Pacific Islander students at US schools came together to form what was then called the APIA Greek Alliance (AGA), a partnership with APIA Vote aimed at registering voters in advance of the 2004 United States elections. These nine organizations were alpha Kappa Delta Phi, Alpha Iota Omicron, Delta Phi Lambda, Lambda Phi Epsilon, Kappa Phi Lambda, Nu Alpha Phi, Pi Alpha Phi, Pi Delta Psi, and Sigma Psi Zeta.

The success of this partnership led to additional collaboration. The AGA hosted the first ever leadership summit in the summer of 2005 with support from OCA - Asian Pacific American Advocates. By the end of this summit, the fraternities and sororities present formed the North American Greek Council (NAGC) which comprised the following seven organizations: alpha Kappa Delta Phi, Alpha Phi Gamma, Delta Phi Lambda,  Pi Alpha Phi, Pi Delta Psi, Sigma Beta Rho, and Sigma Psi Zeta.

In 2006, the NAGC formalized its constitution and renamed itself to the National APIA Panhellenic Association  or National Asian Pacific Islander American Panhellenic Association (NAPA) and recognized the following 9 organization as charter members: alpha Kappa Delta Phi, Alpha Phi Gamma, Delta Phi Lambda, Delta Kappa Delta, Kappa Phi Lambda, Pi Alpha Phi, Pi Delta Psi, Sigma Beta Rho and Sigma Psi Zeta.

In 2017, the member organizations unanimously voted to add Desi to its formal name, a word describing people from the Indian subcontinent or South Asia, and in doing so adopted the acronym APIDA, to explicitly reflect their service of groups with South Asian membership. NAPA remains the preferred abbreviation. The organizations at the time were alpha Kappa Delta Phi, Alpha Phi Gamma, Beta Chi Theta , Chi Sigma Tau, Delta Epsilon Psi, Delta Phi Lambda, Delta Kappa Delta, Delta Phi Omega, Delta Sigma Iota, Iota Nu Delta, Kappa Phi Gamma, Kappa Phi Lambda, Lambda Phi Epsilon, Pi Alpha Phi, Pi Delta Psi, Sigma Beta Rho, Sigma Psi Zeta, and Sigma Sigma Rho.

NAPA has worked with peer organizations like NALFO, NMGC, NIC, NPC and NPHC on legislative issues. For example, in 2018 they successfully opposed legislation that would ban Greek life across all colleges and universities in Tennessee.

Membership Requirements
APIDA requires that its members (organizations) meet Fraternal Information and Programming Group (FIPG) guidelines in Risk management, hazing, and liability insurance. They decision to do so was made in 2006 with then-current groups allowed two years to meet these requirements.

Member organizations
The alphabetical list of NAPA member fraternities and sororities.

See also
List of social fraternities and sororities
Cultural interest fraternities and sororities
Racism in Greek life

External links
 Official website

References

Student societies in the United States
Multiculturalism in the United States
Greek letter umbrella organizations